Émile Druz (born 22 May 1891, date of death unknown) was a French racing cyclist. He rode in the 1927 Tour de France.

References

1891 births
Year of death missing
French male cyclists
Place of birth missing